John Edward Hine  (10 April 1857 – 9 April 1934) was an Anglican bishop in the late 19th and early 20th centuries.

Life
Hine was born in Nottingham in 1857 and educated at University College School and University College, London. A medical doctor, after ordination he was sent as a missionary to Likoma Island in Lake Malawi and was soon promoted to be Bishop of Likoma. Successively translated to Zanzibar and then Northern Rhodesia, in 1916 he returned to England, firstly as Vicar of Lastingham and after that suffragan bishop of Grantham. In 1930, Hine resigned his see and became an assistant bishop, at William Swayne (Bishop of Lincoln)'s request, to make way for Ernest Blackie. He resigned his archdeaconry on 30 June 1933, remaining assistant bishop until the next year.

Hine is commemorated by a statue, installed in 1956, in one of the medieval tabernacles on the west front of St Wulfram's Church, Grantham, where a cat plays with his robe tassel.

References

19th-century Anglican bishops in Africa
20th-century Anglican bishops in Africa
1857 births
1934 deaths
Alumni of University College London
Bishops of Grantham
Anglican bishops of Lusaka
Anglican bishops of Northern Rhodesia
Anglican bishops of Likoma
Anglican bishops of Zanzibar
People educated at University College School